Riders of the Purple Sage is a 1941 American Western film based on the novel by Zane Grey, directed by James Tinling, and starring George Montgomery as Lassiter and Mary Howard as Jane Withersteen. The picture is the fourth of five screen adaptations of Grey's novel produced across an eight-decade span.

Premise

Jim Lassiter (George Montgomery) learns early on that his niece Fay Larkin (Patty Patterson) has been cheated out of her inheritance by crooked Judge Dyer (Robert Barrat).

Cast
 George Montgomery as Jim Lassiter
 Mary Howard as Jane Withersteen
 Robert Barrat as Judge Dyer
 Lynne Roberts as Bess
 Kane Richmond as Adam Dyer
 Patsy Patterson as Fay Larkin
 Richard Lane as Oldring
 Oscar O'Shea as Noah Judkins
 James Gillette as Venters
 Frank McGrath as Pete
 LeRoy Mason as Jerry Card

Other films based on novel
 Riders of the Purple Sage (1918 film) starring William Farnum
 Riders of the Purple Sage (1925 film) starring Tom Mix
 Riders of the Purple Sage (1931 film) starring George O'Brien
 Riders of the Purple Sage (1996 film) starring Ed Harris

References

External links
 
 
 
 
 Riders of the Purple Sage in TV Guide

1941 films
Films set in 1941
1941 Western (genre) films
Films based on works by Zane Grey
American Western (genre) films
Films based on American novels
Films shot in Lone Pine, California
20th Century Fox films
American black-and-white films
Films directed by James Tinling
1940s English-language films
1940s American films